Ashburton is a large town in the Canterbury Region, on the east coast of the South Island of New Zealand. The town is the seat of the Ashburton District.

The town is the 29th-largest urban area in New Zealand and the fourth-largest urban area in the Canterbury Region, after Christchurch, Timaru and Rolleston.

Toponymy
Ashburton was named by the surveyor Captain Joseph Thomas of the New Zealand Land Association, after Francis Baring, 3rd Baron Ashburton, who was a member of the Canterbury Association.  Ashburton's common nickname "Ashvegas", is an ironic allusion to Las Vegas.

Hakatere is the traditional Māori name for the Ashburton River.  The name translates as "to make swift or to flow smoothly".

History
In 1858 William Turton, ran a ferry across the Ashburton river close to where the Ashburton bridge now lies. He also built an accommodation house which along with some stables were the only buildings in Ashburton in 1863.

By 1864 the horse drawn coaches of the Cobb and Co. business travelled through Ashburton between Christchurch and Timaru. This continued until the railway line was built.

The town was surveyed by Robert Park in 1864. It is laid out around two central squares either side of the railway line and main highway, Baring Square East and Baring Square West. The Ashburton Domain was included in the plans for the purposes of gardens and recreation. The 100 acres of land that was identified for the Domain was a "miserable wildness" of spear grass, broom, and tussock.

The Canterbury provincial government granted 20,000 pounds to develop roads in the district in 1873 and in 1874 the railway reached Ashburton.

The Presbyterian church was completed in 1876, The Wesleyan church in 1878 and the Catholic church in 1882.

Ashburton was designated as a borough in 1878. At this stage, there were about 500 buildings within the borough. A cricket pitch was established in the Ashburton Domain in 1878 and the Ashburton Hospital was established in 1879.

Electricity first arrived in Ashburton in 1908. This was supplied by a 30 kilowatt generator powered by a steam traction engine. In 1921 the Ashburton Electric Power Board was established and by 1927 it had 2804 customers.

Netherby was added to the borough of Ashburton in 1917, Hampstead in 1921, and Allenton in 1939 to the borough of Ashburton. In 1955, Tinwald was added to the borough.

Ashburton was used as a training base for the Royal New Zealand Air Force during World War 2 with 50 tiger moth aircraft based there.

On 1 September  2014, there was a violent incident in Ashburton that received nationwide publicity.  A man who had previously been trespassed from the Ashburton Work and Income office arrived at the premises with a shotgun and murdered two front counter workers. At the subsequent trial, the offender was given the third longest sentence on record. In the aftermath of the attack, the security at WINZ offices was reviewed nationwide. In December 2016, the Ministry for Social Development was convicted of breaching workplace safety legislation in relation to the incident.

In 2021, the Ashburton slogan: "Whatever it takes" was scrapped by the Ashburton District Council. Having been in use for approximately 10 years, it has drawn criticism. In 2012, it made a list of Top 10 worst NZ city slogans. The Ashburton welcome sign had been changed surreptitiously at times from ‘Ashburton: Whatever it Takes’ to ‘Ashburton: ‘Whatever’.

In April 2021, a contract was signed to start a $42 million build of a new library and civic centre for Ashburton. A $20 million contribution came from the New Zealand government. The three story building will include council chambers, office space, a recording studio, areas to study in, a library and a performance area. It will also incorporate the Pioneer Hall into the facility. The library is to be named Te Pātaka o kā Tuhituhi and the civic centre is to be named Te Waharoa a Hine Paaka.

A new retail centre called "River Crossing" is planned to open in 2022. Local property developers hope that this will mean the local people will have more opportunities to spend their money in Ashburton rather than Christchurch or Timaru. A March 2020 report found that 32% of retail spending by locals, was spent out of town. Between 150 and 180 jobs are expected to be created as a result of the development.

Geography

Setting
Methven is 33kilometres inland from Ashburton. Rakaia and the Rakaia river are 28kilometres to the north of Ashburton.

The town is the centre of an agricultural and pastoral farming district on the Canterbury Plains. It has one large suburb, Tinwald, south of the Ashburton River / Hakatere. The town has three other suburbs: Allenton, Hampstead and Netherby.

Climate 
On the whole, Ashburton shares a similar climate to Christchurch i.e. a dry temperate climate (Cfb). However, since it lies further inland at a higher altitude to Christchurch, Ashburton experiences a greater range of temperatures. During summer Ashburton can exceed , whilst winter can see regular frosts and annual snowfall.

Rivers and lakes 

The Ashburton River / Hakatere flows across Mid Canterbury from the Southern Alps to the Pacific Ocean. The official name of the river was amended to become a dual name by the Ngāi Tahu Claims Settlement Act 1998. The river passes through the town of Ashburton, separating the south-east suburb of Tinwald from the rest of the town.

The nearest beach to Ashburton is Wakanui beach, but is not safe for swimming due to a strong undertow. In part to rectify the limitations imposed by the lack of recreational waterways, Lake Hood was constructed just south-east of Tinwald.  The Ashburton lakes Lake Heron, Lake Camp and Lake Clearwater are inland. On the road to these lakes are Mount Somers and the Mount Somers walkway.

Governance

Ashburton District Council is the territorial authority for the Ashburton District of New Zealand. The council is led by the mayor of Ashburton, who is currently . There are also nine ward councillors.

Demographics 

The population of Ashburton was recorded as 2,322 in the 1901 census, 8,287 in the 1951 census, 10,176 in the 1956 census and 11,604 in the 1961 census.

Ashburton had a population of 19,284 at the 2018 New Zealand census, an increase of 1,401 people (7.8%) since the 2013 census, and an increase of 3,096 people (19.1%) since the 2006 census. There were 7,644 households. There were 9,531 males and 9,747 females, giving a sex ratio of 0.98 males per female, with 3,642 people (18.9%) aged under 15 years, 3,330 (17.3%) aged 15 to 29, 7,977 (41.4%) aged 30 to 64, and 4,338 (22.5%) aged 65 or older.

Ethnicities were 82.9% European/Pākehā, 9.1% Māori, 7.7% Pacific peoples, 5.8% Asian, and 1.6% other ethnicities (totals add to more than 100% since people could identify with multiple ethnicities).

The proportion of people born overseas was 17.0%, compared with 27.1% nationally.

Although some people objected to giving their religion, 43.0% had no religion, 46.8% were Christian, 0.8% were Hindu, 0.3% were Muslim, 0.4% were Buddhist and 1.9% had other religions.

Of those at least 15 years old, 1,626 (10.4%) people had a bachelor or higher degree, and 4,239 (27.1%) people had no formal qualifications. The employment status of those at least 15 was that 7,638 (48.8%) people were employed full-time, 2,328 (14.9%) were part-time, and 429 (2.7%) were unemployed.

Economy
The economy of Ashburton is influenced by the economy of the Ashburton District as a whole. In the year to March 2020, the gross domestic product (GDP) of Ashburton District was $2,506m, representing 0.8% of New Zealand's total GDP. The largest proportion of the Ashburton District GDP is derived from primary industries, at 27.0%.  This is substantially higher than the 6.2% contribution of primary industries to the national GDP.  The next highest contribution to the district GDP was from 'Other services' representing 26.7% in the district GDP, versus 34.7% in the national economy. Goods-producing industries were 21.3%, versus 18.7% in the national economy.  High-value services (such as knowledge-based service industries) represented the smallest proportion in Ashburton District GDP, at 10.2%, versus 25.6% in the national economy.

The town has businesses providing a wide range of services to farming in the district, including seed merchants, livestock companies, farm machinery dealers, banks, lawyers and accountants.

Agriculture 
Ashburton lies in the middle of the fertile alluvial Canterbury Plains which permits agricultural activity such as dairying, provided irrigation is used. More than 100 local farmers grow potatoes, corn and peas which are processed locally.

The Ashburton District Council has a 40% holding in the company that manages the Rangitata Diversion Race. This scheme diverts water from the Rangitata and South Ashburton rivers into a canal that provides irrigation to large parts of the district.

Vegetable processing 
A vegetable processing factory owned by Talley's is located on the northern outskirts of Ashburton. The factory was built in 1996 to take advantage of the good soils and irrigation of the Ashburton district. The factory processes peas, corn and potatoes. The potatoes are made into French fries, hash browns and wedges. Much of what is processed is exported to overseas customers. The factory employs 360 staff.

Meat processing
Ashburton was home to a lamb processing works from the early 1900s until 2017, when it was closed with the loss of 370 staff due to declining lamb numbers in Canterbury. The pelt house closed in 2019 with the loss of a further 44 staff. Talley's purchased the site in 2020 and had plans to use it to support vegetable production and use the cool stores for their frozen produce.

Cooperative companies 
In 2012, Ashburton was noted for having more cooperative companies operating in its district than in any other area of New Zealand, and was subsequently named by the New Zealand Cooperatives Association the "Cooperative Capital of New Zealand". Several of the 40-plus companies are national companies based outside the district, such as Fonterra, Foodstuffs and Silver Fern Farms (meat processing), but many were local cooperatives, such as the Ashburton Trading Society (farm supplies) and Electricity Ashburton (electricity distribution).

Culture

Museum and Art Gallery 
The Ashburton Museum and Art Gallery share one building, which sits on State Highway 1, just outside the centre of town. As well as temporary exhibitions, the museum has a permanent exhibition tracing the history of the Ashburton district.

When the art gallery opened in 2015, it was unable to display  any art works on the walls as the new air-conditioning unit, being delivered from Italy had not arrived. The 2700 art works in the collection had to remain in storage.

Marae 
The Hakatere marae is located on the northern edge of Ashburton. Although Ashburton is within the rohe or region where the Ngāi Tahu iwi are traditionally based, the Hakatere marae is not a Ngāi Tahu marae. It was built as a marae for people from all iwi. The marae is located on land that was originally the Fairton Primary School.  This land was acquired in 1970 and the Hakatere marae was gazetted as a Māori reserve in 1976. The wharenui was destroyed by an arson attack in 2003. The wharekai was completed in 2007 at a cost of around $300,000.

Attractions and amenities

Ashburton Domain 
 
The Ashburton Domain sits in the centre of Ashburton next to state highway 1. At 37 hectares in size, it includes public gardens, cricket pitches, football fields, tennis courts, bowls club and a croquet club. A playground and paddling pool also have been built in the domain.

Railway museum 

The Plains Vintage Railway and Historical Museum is located in the Tinwald Domain. The railway runs on approximately three kilometres of rural railway line that was once part of the Mount Somers Branch. There are a variety of historical buildings and trains on display.

Ashburton Aviation Museum 
The Ashburton Aviation Museum is located at the Ashburton Airport. The museum has two buildings which display almost  thirty aircraft. These include a Skyhawk formerly used by the New Zealand Air Force, a Vampire FB5 and a Canberra B2 Bomber. The collection also includes the only British Aerospace HS Harrier "Jump-jet" GR3 in the southern hemisphere.

Notable buildings

Ashburton clock tower 
The Ashburton clock tower was built in 1976 by Bradford Construction Ltd and was designed by Warren and Mahoney Architects. The clock, first used in 1904 was installed by Horrell Engineering. The clock tower has won awards including for “Enduring Architecture” in 2004 from the New Zealand Institute of Architects.

Ashburton courthouse 
The Ashburton courthouse is located on Baring Square. The Ashburton Legal Practitioners Society said in 2018 that it was “absolutely crucial” that the Ashburton courthouse is retained, noting that if it were to be closed, the nearest courthouse is either in Christchurch or Timaru. The courthouse was upgraded in the 1990s but needs further upgrades and more space.

Saint Andrews 
Saint Andrews Presbyterian Church was designed by Robert and Edward England and built in 1906. It is a Heritage New Zealand category 2 listed historic place.

Saint Augustine of Canterbury 
Saint Augustine of Canterbury Catholic Church was built between 1930 and 1931. It is a Heritage New Zealand category 1 historic place.

War memorial 
The Ashburton war memorial is a square obelisk and was unveiled on 4 June 1928.

Sport and recreation

Aquatic centre 
A new aquatic centre was opened in Ashburton in May 2015. There are four indoor swimming pools within an 8000 square metre building. There are also four indoor courts and two outdoor courts and a gym. The facility is operated by the Ashburton District Council. The facility cost $30 million to develop and was designed by architects Warren & Mahoney.

Clubs 
The Ashburton Club and Mutual School of Arts (MSA) was founded in 1885. The MSA is a member of the NZ Chartered Clubs Association and is located in the central town. The club itself currently has around 4,000 members on its records.

Golf courses 
Ashburton is home to two golf courses. The Ashburton Golf Course is an 18 hole golf course which was established in 1895. The Tinwald Golf Club has an 18 hole course in the suburb of Tinwald. It was built in 1967.

Horse racing 
The Ashburton Raceway is a horse racing venue that includes both a 1500 metre long trotting track and an 1800 metre long galloping track. There is also a Harness Racing Museum located at the racecourse. The racecourse is located off State Highway 1 at the northern end of Ashburton.

Mountain bike trails 
A mountain bike trail was built by Mountain Bike Ashburton alongside the Ashburton River. The loop track is 11.5 km long.

Rugby 
Ashburton is home to the Mid Canterbury Rugby Union. Mid Canterbury play in the Heartland Championship.

Skiing 
Mount Hutt is the nearest ski field, located inland just past Methven.

Cricket 
Cricket has been played in Ashburton since at least 1877. The Ashburton County Cricket Association was established in 1896 with the name being changed on its centenary to the Mid Canterbury Cricket Association in 1996. Ashburton Domain is venue for Mid Canterbury's home games. The senior men's team won national honours when they won the Hawke Cup in the 2003/04 season.

Speedway 
The Ashburton Speedway provides a race track for a number of categories of cars including stockcars, production saloon cars and street stocks. They also run a demolition derby once a year. The Ashburton Speedway is located next to Ashburton Airport on Seafield road.

Infrastructure

Ashburton Hospital 

Ashburton Hospital is a 74 bed hospital based at 28 Elizabeth Street, Ashburton. The hospital provides medical, surgical, radiology and maternity care. It admits about 5,000 inpatients each year as well as seeing  2,600 day patients and 15,000 outpatients. It is run by Canterbury District Health Board and the rural health service employed approximately 550 staff in 2021.

Rail 
The Main South Line railway line runs through the centre of town. The station opened on 24 August 1874 and the refreshment room was converted from table- to counter-service to save staff and speed service in 1944. The rooms closed in 1970, when the Southerner train started. That train ceased on 10 February 2002, but some barley continues to be sent by train to maltings at Marton. A container terminal is open on weekdays. The station was demolished in 2013 after several resource consent hearings.

Tinwald was the junction for the now-closed Mount Somers Branch railway line. Tinwald opened as Ashburton South on 31 May 1875. It was renamed from 18 March 1878 and closed before 1993 to passengers and on 11 October 1981 to all but private siding traffic. Part of the branch still operates as the Plains Vintage Railway.

Funding from the New Zealand government and the Ashburton District Council for a new rail freight hub was provided in October 2021. The project will move the rail container terminal from the centre of Ashburton to Fairton. The project is expected to be complete by the end of 2022, and has an estimated cost of $14m. It should help ease congestion on the roads in the centre of Ashburton.

Road 
State Highway 1 runs through the centre of Ashburton and provides the main road connection between Christchurch and Dunedin. The highway crosses the Ashburton river via a bridge that is the only direct route across the river for local traffic and State Highway 1 traffic.

SH1 Ashburton river bridge
On 1 June 2021, a severe flood in the Ashburton river caused scouring damage to piers supporting the bridge, and the bridge deck subsided, leading to a temporary closure. At the time of closure, there were no other routes for SH1 traffic wanting to go north or south across the Ashburton river, because all inland routes were also closed. On 3 June 2021, the bridge was re-opened for heavy traffic during daylight hours only, and all restrictions were lifted on 10 June.

The Ashburton District Council has been trying to obtain funding from Waka Kotahi (New Zealand Transport Agency) for a second bridge for local traffic and to provide more resilience to the road network. In 2021, the additional bridge was planned to be built in 15 years time.

Other routes
State Highway 77 starts in Ashburton and heads towards Methven, and then through the Rakaia gorge and on to Darfield.

Air 
The Ashburton Airport is located near the town centre and is an active light (GA and Microlight) aviation hub and home of the Mid Canterbury Aero Club (GA) and Ashburton Aviation Pioneers. 

In October 2021, the future of  how the airport was being operated was being debated as managing the challenge of increasing aviation activity with the desire to develop the land around the airport could cause conflict due to the potential of noise pollution from the airport.

Education

There are seven primary schools, an intermediate school, a secondary school and a composite school in Ashburton. All rolls are as of 
 Allenton School is a state contributing primary (Year 1–6) school. It has a roll of  students.
 Ashburton Borough School is a state full primary (Year 1–8) school. It has a roll of  students.
 Ashburton Christian School is a state-integrated evangelical Christian composite (Year 1–13) school. The school opened in February 2009 as a private school, and integrated into the state system in March 2011. It has a roll of  students.
 Ashburton College is a state secondary (Year 9–13) school. The school opened in 1965 following the merger of Ashburton High School and Hakatere College. It has a roll of  students.
 Ashburton Intermediate School is a state intermediate (Year 7–8) school. The school opened in 1974. It has a roll of  students.
 Ashburton Netherby School is a state contributing primary school. The school opened in 1959. It has a roll of  students.
 Fairton School is a state contributing primary school. It has a roll of  students.
 Hampstead School is a state contributing primary school. It has a roll of  students.
 St Joseph's School is a state-integrated Catholic full primary school. It has a roll of  students.
 Tinwald School is a state contributing primary school. It has a roll of  students.

Media 
Ashburton media includes the Ashburton Guardian daily newspaper, the Mid Canterbury Herald, a free weekly community newspaper owned by Fairfax Media which comes out every Wednesday, The Courier, another free weekly community newspaper owned by the Otago Daily Times, and the Mid Canterbury-focused AshburtonOnline website. Radio Port FM is based in Timaru; Newstalk ZB and Classic Hits ZEFM are re-broadcast from other out-of-town stations.

Notable people
Notable people from Ashburton have included the former Prime Minister of New Zealand, Jenny Shipley, international operatic tenor Simon O'Neill, Olympic silver medal cyclist Hayden Roulston and New Zealand television and radio personalities Simon Barnett and Robyn Malcolm.
 
Rugby union players Chris King and Fergie McCormick were born in Ashburton.

Hugo Friedlander was the second Mayor of Ashburton (1879–1881, 1890–1892 and 1898–1901), but left for Auckland in 1918 due to anti-German feelings caused by WWI.

John Grigg was a local landowner and Member of Parliament in the mid 19th century.

Dorothy Eden, a prolific novelist, grew up in Ashburton.

References

Sources

External links 

 Ashburton District Council
 AshburtonOnline

 
Populated places in Canterbury, New Zealand